The 2017 Nagoya Grampus season is Nagoya Grampus' 1st season in the J2 League following their relegation at the end of the 2016 season.

Season events
Yahiro Kazama was appointed as the club's new manager on 4 January 2017.

Squad

Out on loan

Transfers

Winter

In:

Out:

Summer

In:

Out:

Competitions

J2. League

League table

Results summary

Results by round

Results

J1 League Promotion Playoffs

Emperor's Cup

Squad statistics

Appearances and goals

|-
|colspan="14"|Players away on loan:

|-
|colspan="14"|Players who left Nagoya Grampus during the season:

|}

Goal Scorers

Disciplinary record

References

Nagoya Grampus
Nagoya Grampus seasons